Mavriki is a community in the municipal unit of Aigio, Achaea, Greece. It consists of the villages Kato Mavriki, Ano Mavriki and Agios Ioannis. It is located on the left bank of the river Selinountas, 5 km south of Aigio. In 2011, the population was 380 for Kato Mavriki, and 403 for the community Mavriki. Mavriki suffered damage from the 2007 Greek forest fires.

Population

External links
 Mavriki GTP Travel Pages

See also

List of settlements in Achaea

References

Aigialeia
Aigio
Populated places in Achaea